Mine Bengidzakiwe is a traditional song sung in native ceremonies in Swaziland, which became a local hit in 2007.

Background
Mine Bengidzakiwe is a traditional song whose composer is anonymous. The song is still sung in Swaziland's ceremonies. The direct translation of the title is "I was drunk".  It concerns a typical African homestead where a husband has two wives. One wife locks the other in a "hut" (traditional kitchen) in the hope of being alone with the husband. A third person says "You should never lock someone in the hut" and the culprit responds with the line, "I was drunk".

Recording
"Mine Bengidzakiwe", was recorded by artists Deborah Steenkamp and Sifiso S-tone Magagula, in Johannesburg, South Africa, reportedly in the living room of producer Sabside  with minimal studio equipment.  It was remixed by Sabside and became a hit from late 2007 to 2008.  It was licensed to DJ Christos who later released it as part of a compilation Edladleni for the Sdunkero label. It was also licensed to Afrotainment,  a Durban based label and was later released under a compilation for DJ CNDO.

Conflict
Since its release the origin of the song has been a matter of controversy in the music industry, apparently because of the number of licensors involved.

References

External links
 Listen to it
 16th Note Music
 The Remix

Swazi music